"Dance Off" is a song by American hip hop duo Macklemore & Ryan Lewis featuring British actor and musician Idris Elba and fellow American musician Anderson .Paak, released in the United States, Australia, New Zealand, and selected European countries on February 25, 2016 as the second single from the duo's studio album This Unruly Mess I've Made (2016).

Background and release
Following the large success of the duo's debut album The Heist (2012), Macklemore revealed on January 15, 2016 with an Instagram post the This Unruly Mess I've Made release. "Dance Off" was released as second single of the album on February 25, 2016, succeeding "Downtown".

Music video
The song's music video was uploaded to Ryan Lewis's YouTube, now known as Macklemore LLC, channel on May 17, 2016. It was directed by Lewis & Jason Koenig.

Critical reception
The song received positive reviews from music critics. Killian Young said that "Dance Off" makes nod to the pillars of hip hop culture: rapping, DJing, tagging, breakdancing and piano groove. David Turner of MTV said that "Dance Off" sounds like rolling into the morgue by the 27th second, when the song says "I grab my ankle and pull it up / And do that thing where I move my butt". Spencer Kornhaber of The Atlantic commented that the song sounds like the director Vincent Price in "Thriller" (of Michael Jackson), and said that Macklemore "frets about the adequacy of what's between his legs. In his world, music does not help you transcend your insecurities—it heightens them.".

Chart performance
In Australia, "Dance Off" entered the Australian Singles Chart at number twenty one on March 7, 2016.

Track listing

Charts

Weekly charts

Year-end charts

Certifications

Release history

References

2016 singles
2016 songs
Macklemore songs
Ryan Lewis songs
Anderson .Paak songs
Comedy rap songs
Idris Elba songs
Songs written by Anderson .Paak
Songs written by Idris Elba
Songs written by Macklemore
Songs written by Ryan Lewis